Hiroshi Mori may refer to:
 Hiroshi Mori (astronomer) (born 1958), Japanese amateur astronomer
 Hiroshi Mori (writer) (born 1957), Japanese writer and engineer